Epimesophleps is a genus of moths in the family Gelechiidae.

Species
 Epimesophleps aphridias Rebel, 1925
 Epimesophleps symmocella Rebel, 1907

References

Gelechiinae